San Felice may refer to the following places in Italy:

San Felice a Cancello, in the province of Caserta
San Felice Circeo, in the province of Latina
San Felice del Benaco, in the province of Brescia
San Felice sul Panaro, in the province of Modena
San Felice del Molise, in the province of Campobasso
Senale-San Felice, the Italian name for Unsere Liebe Frau im Walde-St. Felix in the province of Bolzano

Churches 

 San Felice, Venice, a Roman Catholic church in Florence, region of Tuscany, Italy
 San Felice da Cantalice a Centocelle, a Roman Catholic titular church in Rome

See also 
 Felix (name)#Saints
 Felice (disambiguation)